Out of the Dark (1964) is a thriller novel by American writer Ursula Curtiss, about how a prank call by a couple of teenagers ends up with a murderer on their trail.

In 1965, the novel was filmed as I Saw What You Did, directed by William Castle and starring Joan Crawford; and again in 1988 for television with the same title, starring Shawnee Smith, Tammy Lauren and David and Robert Carradine.

1964 American novels
American novels adapted into films
American thriller novels